Chemehuevi Valley Airport  is a public airport located four miles (6.4 km) north of Chemehuevi Valley, serving as one of two airports in the Lake Havasu City, Arizona, United States metropolitan area. The airport is mostly used for general aviation.

Facilities 
 Runway 16/34: 5,000 x 75 ft (1,524 × 23 m), surface: asphalt

References

External links 

Airports in San Bernardino County, California